This is a sortable list of comedy horror films.

See also
 Lists of films

References

Horror
Lists of horror films